Robert Emmett Jeffery Jr. (January 30, 1875 – May 19, 1935) was an American lawyer, politician, and diplomat who served as the United States ambassador to Uruguay from 1915 to 1921.

Early life and education 
Jeffery was born in Mount Olive, Izard County, Arkansas, the oldest of 10 siblings. He studied law and was admitted to the Arkansas Bar Association in 1925.

Career 
Jeffrey was elected to the Arkansas House of Representatives in 1900 and served until 1902. He also operated a legal practice in Newport, Arkansas. He was elected prosecuting attorney of the Arkansas Circuit Court for the third circuit in 1906 and became a judge of the same court in 1910. A childhood friend of Congressman William Allan Oldfield, Jeffery was recommended for a position in the Wilson administration. He was appointed to serve as ambassador to Uruguay in 1915 and remained in the position until 1921. After returning to Arkansas, Jeffery became an advocate for education in rural communities.

References 

1875 births
1935 deaths
Democratic Party members of the Arkansas House of Representatives
People from Izard County, Arkansas
Ambassadors of the United States to Uruguay
Arkansas lawyers
People from Newport, Arkansas